The discography of Japanese pop singer Aya Ueto consists of five studio albums, two compilation albums, sixteen singles, eight video albums and eighteen music videos.

Albums

Studio albums

Compilation albums

Singles

Videos

Video albums

Music videos

References 

Discography
Discographies of Japanese artists
Pop music discographies